Avvakumov (masculine) or Avvakumova (feminine) is a Russian last name, a variant of Abakumov. It is shared by the following people:
Ekaterina Avvakumova, Russian and South Korean biathlete
Irina Avvakumova (b. 1991), Russian ski jumper
Yury Avvakumov, nominee for Project of the Year, Kandinsky Prize 2007

See also
Avvakumovo, a rural locality (a village) in Kalininsky District of Tver Oblast, Russia
Abbakumovo, several rural localities in Russia

References

Notes

Sources
И. М. Ганжина (I. M. Ganzhina). "Словарь современных русских фамилий" (Dictionary of Modern Russian Last Names). Москва, 2001. 



Russian-language surnames